Sambro is a rural fishing community on the Chebucto Peninsula in the Halifax Regional Municipality, in Nova Scotia, Canada.

Located on the Atlantic Ocean at the head of Sambro Harbour, the community is immediately west of the entrance to Halifax Harbour.  Sambro is located at the end of Route 306.

Sambro Island is located within the community southeast of the harbour and is home to the Sambro Island Lighthouse, the oldest operational lighthouse in the Americas (since 1758).  It stands 62 feet on the top of the rocky island. The original lens from the lighthouse is on display at the Maritime Museum of the Atlantic in Halifax.

Sambro Harbour also has a small pepperpot style lighthouse located at the harbour entrance.

History
Three years after the founding of Halifax in 1752, 26 families settled and worked on Sambro Island after Governor Edward Cornwallis saw the need to populate the area with British settlers to prevent a French attack by sea.  The community has evolved into a fishing and tourist community over the centuries, although many residents currently commute into Halifax for employment.

During the American Revolution, Sambro witnessed numerous naval battles, such as the Naval battle off Halifax.  On 10 July 1780, the British privateer Resolution (16 guns) under the command of Thomas Ross engaged the American privateer Viper (16 guns) off of Halifax at Sambro Light.  There was another engagement, described as "one of the bloodiest battles in the history of privateering". The two privateers began a "severe engagement", during which both pounded each other with cannon fire for about 90 minutes. The death toll was 18 British and 33 Americans.

On 1 September 1782 the American Privateer Wasp sailed to Pennant Point where they were confronted by three men from Sambro who fired on them, killing one of his crew and wounding three others including Captain Thomas Thompson.  Captain Perry took command of the vessel and the privateers took one of the Sambro men prisoner. The privateers buried their crew member on an island in Pennant bay.  They then began their return to Massachusetts by rowing to West Dover, Nova Scotia and then on to Cross Island ("Croo Island") just off Lunenburg ("Malegash").

During the American Civil War, Sambro played a pivotal role in the Chesapeake Affair.  A Northern vessel was stolen by a crew Southern sympathisers who were loading the vessel with coal at Sambro for the journey to the southern states. Northern American warships arrested the vessel and eventually took it to Halifax.

See also 
 List of communities in Nova Scotia

Notes

References
HRM Civic Address Map

External links
Lighthouse

General Service Areas in Nova Scotia
Communities in Halifax, Nova Scotia